College of Professional Studies or School of Professional Studies may refer to:
George Washington University College of Professional Studies
New York University School of Professional Studies
Marquette University College of Professional Studies
CUNY School of Professional Studies
Goodwin College of Professional Studies
Metropolitan School of Professional Studies
Northwestern University School of Professional Studies
San Diego State University College of Professional Studies & Fine Arts
Saint Louis University School for Professional Studies

See also
University of Professional Studies, Accra, Ghana
Master of Professional Studies
Georgetown University School of Continuing Studies